Thomas Byrnes may refer to:

Thomas Joseph Byrnes (1860–1898), Premier of Queensland
Thomas F. Byrnes (1842–1910), New York City Police inspector
Thomas F. Byrnes (politician) (1859–1916), American politician from New York
Tommy Byrnes (1923–1981), American basketball player

See also 
 Thomas Byrne (disambiguation) 
 Thomas Burns (disambiguation)